Ricardo José Rodríguez (born August 31, 1992) is a Venezuelan former professional baseball pitcher who played in Major League Baseball (MLB) for the Texas Rangers in 2017 and 2018.

Professional career
Rodríguez signed with the Texas Rangers as an international free agent on November 20, 2010. He made his professional debut in 2011 for the DSL Rangers, posting a 4–1 record with a 4.05 ERA in 20 innings. He repeated with the DSL Rangers in 2012, posting a 3–3 record with a 2.87 ERA in 47 innings. Rodríguez split the 2013 season between the DSL Rangers, the AZL Rangers of the Rookie-level Arizona League, and the Spokane Indians of the Class A Short Season Northwest League; posting a combined 0–4 record with a 3.09 ERA in 32 innings between the three levels. In 2014, he spent the season with the Hickory Crawdads of the Class A South Atlantic League, going 5–5 with a 3.07 ERA in  innings (29 games - 12 starts).

Rodríguez appeared in five games for the Hickory and in two games for the Round Rock Express of the Triple-A Pacific Coast League, before he underwent season-ending Tommy John surgery in 2015. The surgery also caused him to miss the entire 2016 season rehabilitating. He began the 2017 season with the Down East Wood Ducks of the Class A-Advanced Carolina League and was later promoted to the Frisco RoughRiders of the Class AA Texas League. In 35 combined games, he posted a 5–1 record with a 1.34 ERA and 61 strikeouts over 47 innings. 

The Rangers promoted Rodríguez to the major leagues on August 8, 2017, becoming the first Wood Duck to be promoted to the major leagues. Rodriguez made his debut on August 14, 2017 in a game against the Detroit Tigers, pitching one scoreless inning. He recorded his first career strikeout against Tigers batter James McCann and struck out the next batter, Alex Presley, as well. He ended the 2017 season after posting a 0–1 record with a 6.23 ERA over 13 innings in 16 games for Texas.

Rodríguez started the 2018 season on the 60–day DL with right biceps tendinitis and elbow inflammation. He rehabbed with Frisco and Round Rock before being activated off the DL and optioned to Round Rock. Between the two levels, he posted a combined 1–2 record with a 2.51 ERA and 28 strikeouts over  innings. He recorded a 0–0 record with a 4.05 ERA in  major league innings in 2018.

On November 30, 2018, Rodríguez was non-tendered by the Rangers and was granted free agency. Rodríguez was re-signed to a minor-league contract on February 5, 2019. It was also announced that Rodríguez had undergone shoulder surgery in December 2018, which caused him to miss the entire 2019 season.

References

External links

1992 births
Living people
Arizona League Rangers players
Dominican Summer League Rangers players
Venezuelan expatriate baseball players in the Dominican Republic
Down East Wood Ducks players
Frisco RoughRiders players
Hickory Crawdads players
Leones del Caracas players
Major League Baseball pitchers
Major League Baseball players from Venezuela
Sportspeople from Maracay
Round Rock Express players
Spokane Indians players
Texas Rangers players
Venezuelan expatriate baseball players in the United States